The 1951 Oregon Webfoots football team represented the University of Oregon as a memmber of the Pacific Coast Conference (PCC) during the 1951 college football season. In their first season under head coach Len Casanova, the Webfoots compiled a 2–8 record (1–6 against PCC opponents), finished in eighth place in the PCC, and were outscored by their opponents, 317 to 130. The team played its home games at Hayward Field in Eugene, Oregon.

Schedule

References

Oregon
Oregon Ducks football seasons
Oregon Webfoots football